is a Japanese film critic, cartoon critic, comic translator and overseas comic / animation researcher.  Ono is the leading authority on the publication, research and introduction of overseas comics (gaikoku manga) in Japan. From 1963 to 1974 he worked for NHK. He is a visiting professor in the Asia Department of Kokushikan University, a board member of the Japan Society for Studies in Manga and Comic Art, and a member of ASIFA JAPAN, the Japan Cartoonists Association, and the Japan Science Fiction Writer's Club.

Life 
Ono was born in Setagaya, Tokyo. His father was the mangaka . He graduated from the International Christian University of Tokyo in 1963.

In 1968,  invited by Osamu Tezuka, Ono wrote a column for COM magazine, presenting foreign (especially American) comics titles to Japanese readers. In 1970 he partnered with Ryoichi Ikegami on writing the manga adaptation of Spider-Man for Shonen Magazine.

In 2006, Ono was awarded the 10th Tezuka Osamu Cultural Prize Special Award.

References

External links 
 Kousei Ono profile at Asifa

1939 births
Japanese film critics
Japanese translators
Comics scholars
Living people
People from Setagaya
People from Tokyo